Carex californica is a tussock-forming species of perennial sedge in the family Cyperaceae. It is native to western parts of the United States.

The sedges have long rhizomes and form colonies.

The species was first described by the botanist Liberty Hyde Bailey in 1889 as a part of Memoirs of the Torrey Botanical Club. It has one synonym; Carex polymorpha var. californica as described by Georg Kukenthal.

See also
List of Carex species

References

californica
Taxa named by Liberty Hyde Bailey
Plants described in 1889
Flora of California
Flora of Idaho
Flora of Oregon
Flora of Washington (state)